Unforgiven is a three-part British television drama series, written by Sally Wainwright and directed by David Evans, that first broadcast on ITV and UTV in January 2009, and later on STV in 2012. Produced by the Red Production Company, Unforgiven follows Ruth Slater (Suranne Jones), a woman found guilty of murdering two police officers when she was a teenager. Upon release from prison, Ruth is determined to find her sister, who was adopted shortly after the incident. The series is set in Yorkshire, specifically the village of Boothtown in Halifax.

Broadcast across three consecutive Mondays at 9:00 pm, the series averaged 7 million viewers across its run. Unforgiven won the award for Best Drama Series or Serial at the 2009 RTS Programme Awards. The series was released on DVD on 2 February 2009. A film adaptation of the series, named The Unforgivable, starring Sandra Bullock and directed by Nora Fingscheidt, was released in theaters on 24 November 2021, prior to streaming on Netflix on 10 December.

Cast
 Suranne Jones as Ruth Slater
 Siobhan Finneran as Izzy Ingram
 Peter Davison as John Ingram
 Douglas Hodge as Michael Belcombe
 Jemma Redgrave as Rachel Belcombe
 Matthew McNulty as Steve Whelan
 Emily Beecham as Lucy Belcombe
 Jack Deam as Kieran Whelan
 Flora Spencer-Longhurst as Emily Belcombe
 Faye McKeever as Hannah Whelan
 George Costigan as Eddie Ackroyd 
 Rebekah Staton as Tracey Broadbent
 Daryl Fishwick as Carol Crossland 
 Freddie Jackson as Charlie Ingram 
 Matt Hall as Rufus Ingram 
 Will Mellor as Brad
 Bill Rodgers as Alan

Episodes

References

External links
 

2009 British television series debuts
2009 British television series endings
2000s British drama television series
Television series created by Sally Wainwright
ITV television dramas
2000s British television miniseries
English-language television shows
Television shows adapted into films
Television shows set in Yorkshire
Television series by Red Production Company